Marayat Rollet-Andriane, formerly Marayat Krasaesin or her birthname Marayat Bibidh (born 19 January 1932 – 12 June 2005), known by the pen name Emmanuelle Arsan, was a Thai-French novelist, best known for the novel featuring the fictional character Emmanuelle, a woman who sets out on a voyage of sexual self-discovery under varying circumstances. It was later claimed that the real author of the book was her husband, Louis-Jacques Rollet-Andriane.

Early life
Arsan was born Marayat Bibidh on 19 January 1932 in Bangkok, Thailand, into an aristocratic Siamese family closely connected to the royal family. Marayat's family home was in the affluent Ekkamai District of the Thai capital, where she reportedly discovered her sexuality in the company of her little sister Vasana.

After attending primary school in Thailand, Marayat was sent by her parents to Switzerland to continue her studies at the extremely selective Institut Le Rosey boarding school, located in Rolle, Canton of Vaud. The school offered a bilingual English-French education to the offspring of the international elite. At a ball there in 1948, the 16-year-old Marayat first met her future husband, 30-year-old French diplomat Louis-Jacques Rollet-Andriane. Although it was love at first sight, they did not marry until 1956, then settled in Thailand, where Louis-Jacques was given a diplomatic posting at the UNESCO mission in Bangkok.

Bangkok in the late 1950s was a relatively small, secretive, and highly respectable city. It was not yet the open-air brothel that it would become during the mid-1960s and early 1970s. That change was partly due to the Vietnam War, when thousands of off-duty U.S. servicemen, assigned to the US Air Force airbases in Thailand, flooded the capital's streets in search of cheap sex. They were soon to be followed by Western tourists.

Within the selective atmosphere of the Sports Club, Louis-Jacques and Marayat, with their hedonistic philosophy of communal sex, quickly created a sensation among the expatriate interlopers, diplomats, pseudospies, bored spouses, and jet-setters who drifted in and out.  As a result, the couple's reputation soon spread beyond the restricted circle of the initiated and turned the Thai capital into a popular destination for swingers.  At this time, they had their first encounter with the idle Italian Prince Dado Ruspoli, who belonged to the international playboy elite of the 1950s and whose discourse on sex had a profound impact on Marayat and Louis-Jacques. They immediately made Dado their "spiritual guide" and "high priest of love".

In 1963, Louis-Jacques was posted to Italy, and for five years, the couple resided in both Venice and Rome, where they again met Ruspoli. He introduced them to the high society of transalpine libertinage. From 1968 to 1980, Marayat and her husband often alternated between Paris and Bangkok.

Literary career
The novel Emmanuelle was initially published and distributed clandestinely in France in 1959, without an author's name. Successive editions were ascribed to Emmanuelle Arsan, who was subsequently revealed to be Marayat Rollet-Andriane. Though the novel was sometimes hinted to be quasi-autobiographical, it was later revealed that the actual author was her husband Louis-Jacques Rollet-Andriane. Several more novels were published under the Emmanuelle Arsan pseudonym.

Between 1974 and 1976, Arsan and her husband, in association with Just Jaeckin, published the erotic magazine Emmanuelle, le magazine du plaisir (Emmanuelle, the pleasure magazine) in France, contributing photographs and text.

Film and TV career
Following the success of the eponymous 1974 film adaptation of her novel, directed by Just Jaeckin, Arsan was the titular director and scriptwriter of the film Laure (1976) about the sexual discoveries of a younger "Emmanuelle" named Laure, again in an exotic setting. The film was in fact directed by Louis-Jacques Rollet-Andriane and Roberto D'Ettorre Piazzoli, though Rollet-Andriane, reportedly frustrated by problems related to his collaboration with the producer, Ovidio G. Assonitis, asked that Emmanuelle Arsan's name not be associated with the project, resulting in the film being credited to an anonymous director.

Using the screen name "Marayat Andriane", Arsan appeared in the film The Sand Pebbles (1966), and in an episode of the American series The Big Valley ("Turn of a Card", 1967). Although she signed a contract with 20th Century Fox, she never worked as an actress for that company again. Her only other film appearance, credited as Emmanuelle Arsan, was in Laure, which was also released under the alternative title Forever Emmanuelle.

Personal life
Marayat spoke fluent Thai, French, and English.  Her hobbies and passions included writing, reading, photography, cinema, and antiques, among others.  Louis-Jacques Rollet-Andriane and she had two daughters, Sophie and Danièle. She is known to have had relationships with the French beatnik writer, mime, and photographer Théo Lesouac’h, and allegedly with the American actor Steve McQueen, during the shooting of The Sand Pebbles, although what really went on between them remains a mystery.

Later life
At the beginning of the 1980s, Louis-Jacques and Marayat decided to settle down in France for a much quieter life. An Iranian friend offered the couple a plot of land in the south of the country, near the commune of Callas, in the Var.  It was in this woodland domain they constructed their retirement place, "Chantelouve d’Emmanuelle", an isolated single-storey house built around a vast patio. Louis-Jacques continued with his writing, happy to correspond with Emmanuelles fans under his pen name Emmanuelle Arsan, while Marayat, her dreams of stardom far behind her, was content to grow old gracefully, with the occasional visit to Bangkok. It was at this point that Nitya Phenkun entered their lives. She was an old acquaintance of Louis-Jacques, having been his secretary (and mistress) during his diplomatic posting in Bangkok, and on moving to Chantelouve, she took up her former functions, reportedly forming a threesome with the Rollet-Andriane couple.

Illness and death
Their idyll was shattered in 2001, when Marayat suddenly fell ill. She was diagnosed with systemic scleroderma, a rare and incurable autoimmune disease, which had first given her trouble at the age of 20. After a period of remission that had lasted for 49 years, the disease returned and attacked her legs, causing her acute suffering and rapidly affecting her mobility. Her health further deteriorated when gangrene rapidly ensued, and both of her legs had to be amputated above the knee. She was, therefore, forced to spend the remaining four years of her life bedridden, being treated at home by a private nurse. Marayat Rollet-Andriane died on 12 June 2005 at Chantelouve, aged 73. Her husband died three years later, in April 2008.
 
Nitya Phenkun, the sole beneficiary of the copyright of Emmanuelle, returned to Thailand soon after Louis-Jacques' death, and put Chantelouve up for sale.

Works

BooksIn French 1959 Emmanuelle – Éric Losfeld (clandestine edition), 308 pages
 1960 Emmanuelle L'anti-vierge – Éric Losfeld (clandestine edition), 356 pages
 1967 Emmanuelle – La leçon d'homme – Paris, Éric Losfeld, Le Terrain Vague, 232 pages
 1968 Emmanuelle – L'anti-vierge – Paris, Éric Losfeld, Le Terrain Vague, 296 pages
 1968 Epître à Paul VI (Lettre ouverte au pape, sur la pilule) - Paris, Éric Losfeld
 1969 Nouvelles de l'érosphère – Paris, Éric Losfeld, Le Terrain Vague, 215 pages
 1969 Dessins érotiques de Bertrand vol. 1- Pistils ou étamines, une liesse promise - Paris, Eric Losfeld
 1971 Emmanuelle à Rome (under the pseudonym Bee Van Kleef) – Paris, Eureditions, 280 pages. reprint: Montréal, Les Presses Libres, 1972. reprint: Toulouse, Livre d'Oc, 1979. reprint: Paris, Belfond, 2013
 1974 Mon "Emmanuelle", leur pape, et mon Éros – Paris, Christian Bourgois, 219 pages
 1974 L'Hypothèse d'Éros – Paris, Filipacchi, 287 pages
 1975 Les Enfants d'Emmanuelle – Paris, Opta, 317 pages
 1976 Laure – Paris, Pierre Belfond, 312 pages
 1976 Néa – Paris, Opta, 264 pages
 1978 Toute Emmanuelle - Paris, Pierre Belfond, 224 pages
 1979 Vanna – Paris, Pierre Belfond, 315 pages
 1983 Sainte louve - Paris, Pierre Belfond, 352 pages
 1988 Les Soleils d'Emmanuelle - Paris, Pierre Belfond, 264 pages. reprint: Paris, Belfond, 2013
 1988 Emmanuelle (Première édition intégrale) [first unabridged edition] – Paris, Robert Laffont/Jean-Jacques Pauvert
 1989 Les Débuts dans la vie - Paris, Le Grand Livre du mois, 191 pages. reprint: Paris, Belfond, 2013
 1989 Valadié - Paris, Éditions Lignes, 190 pages
 1991 Chargée de mission - Paris, Pierre Belfond, 201 pages
 1993 Bonheur - Les Cahiers de l'Égaré, 91 pages
 1994 Aurélie - Paris, Pierre Belfond, 213 pages. reprint: Paris, Belfond, 2013
 2003 La Siamoise nue - Paris, Le Cercle, 552 pages
 2008 Bonheur 2 - Les Cahiers de l'Égaré, 125 pages
 2008 Parce qu'ils ne pouvaient pas s'en empêcher, in: Disparition by Michel Bories, Les Cahiers de l'Égaré, 250 pages
 2016 La Philosophie nue - Éditions Le Sélénite, 116 pagesIn English translation'''

 1978 

Film
 1966 The Sand Pebbles 1967 The Big Valley (episode "Turn of a Card")
 1976 LaureSee alsoEmmanuelle (novel)EmmanuelleForever EmmanuelleJust Jaeckin
Roberto D'Ettorre Piazzoli
Sylvia Kristel

 Footnotes 

References
Clovis Goux, Emmanuelle était un homme, Lui magazine n.º 4, 4 February 2014, pp. 128–134.
Francis Leroi, 70, années érotiques, éditions La Musardine, 1999.
Ovidio G. Assonitis, Beyond the Screen. Il cinema di Ovidio G. Assonitis'', "Nocturno dossier", n.° 82, May 2009, pp. 46–51.

External links 

 Emmanuelle Arsan. French (adult) website devoted to Emmanuelle Arsan.

1932 births
2005 deaths
Deaths from scleroderma
French erotica writers
20th-century French novelists
21st-century French novelists
20th-century French women writers
21st-century French women writers
Emmanuelle Arsan
Pseudonymous women writers
French people of Thai descent
Emmanuelle
20th-century pseudonymous writers
21st-century pseudonymous writers
Alumni of Institut Le Rosey